Constantin I. Nicolaescu (3 February 1861 – 20 May 1945) was a Romanian politician.

Biography
Born in Târgoviște, he attended Saint Sava National College in Bucharest, followed by the University of Bucharest. There, he obtained a law degree, subsequently working as a magistrate and lawyer. A member of the National Liberal Party, he was first elected deputy in 1892. Nicolaescu was prefect of Dâmbovița County from 1897 to 1899, and again in 1901. He was secretary general in the Interior Ministry from 1902 to 1904, and again from 1907 to 1908. After leaving the ministry, he became head of Casa rurală bank. In 1914, he was elected senator. In 1920, he was vice president of the agrarian committee, shortly before land reform was carried out. Nicolaescu twice served as Senate President: February to March 1926 and July 1927 to November 1928.

Notes

1861 births
1945 deaths
People from Târgoviște
Saint Sava National College alumni
University of Bucharest alumni
National Liberal Party (Romania) politicians
Presidents of the Senate of Romania
Members of the Senate of Romania
Members of the Chamber of Deputies (Romania)
Prefects of Romania
19th-century Romanian lawyers